
Dahe may refer to:

Dahé, arrondissement in the Mono department of Benin
Dahe Glacier, a glacier in the Saint Johns Range, Victoria Land, Antarctica
Dahe Daily, newspaper based in Henan, China

Places in China

Towns
Dahe, Liupanshui (大河), town in Liupanshui, Guizhou
Dahe, Sandu County (大河), town in Sandu Shui Autonomous County, Guizhou
Dahe, Tongzi County (大河), town in Tongzi County, Guizhou
Dahe, Shijiazhuang, town in Shijiazhuang, Hebei
Dahe, Rongcheng County (大河), town in Rongcheng County, Hebei
Dahe, Henan (大河), town in Tongbai County, Henan
Dahe, Huangmei County (大河), town in Huangmei County, Hubei
Dahe, Laifeng County (大河), town in Laifeng County, Hubei
Dahe, Ankang (大河), town in Ankang, Shaanxi
Dahe, Xixiang County (大河), town in Xixiang County, Shaanxi
Dahe, Nanbu County (大河), town in Nanbu County, Sichuan
Dahe, Nanjiang County (大河), town in Nanjiang County, Sichuan
Dahe, Xinjiang (大河), town in Barköl Kazakh Autonomous County, Xinjiang
Dahe, Yunnan (大河), town in Fuyuan County, Yunnan

Townships
Dahe Township, Chongqing (大河乡), township in Wuxi County, Chongqing
Dahe Township, Gansu (大河乡), township in Sunan Yugur Autonomous County, Gansu
Dahe Township, Guangxi (大河乡), township in Guilin, Guangxi
Dahe Township, Bijie (大河乡), township in Bijie, Guizhou
Dahe Township, Zhangbei County (大河乡), township in Zhangbei County, Hebei
Dahe Township, Bazhong (大和乡), township in Bazhong, Sichuan
Dahe Township, Wangcang County (大河乡), township in Wangcang County, Sichuan
Dahe Township, Yanyuan County (大河乡), township in Yanyuan County, Sichuan

Historical eras
Dahe (大和, 827–835), era name used by Emperor Wenzong of Tang
Dahe (大和, 929–935), era name used by Yang Pu, emperor of Wu